Spandaryan may refer to:
Spandaryan, Shirak, Armenia
Spandaryan, Syunik, Armenia
Spandarian Reservoir, Syunik, Armenia
Silikyan, Yerevan, Armenia
Suren Spandaryan, Bolshevik